Gaius Rabuleius was an Ancient Roman tribune of the plebs in 486 BC. He attempted to mediate between the consuls in their disputes about the agrarian law proposed by the consul Spurius Cassius Vecellinus in that year.

References

Footnotes

5th-century BC Romans
Tribunes of the plebs